S. S. Chakravarthy (S.Shajahan Chakravarthy) is an Indian film producer in Tamil cinema. He has produced a number of Tamil films through his Production company is NIC Arts. Most of his films had actor Ajith Kumar & Silambarasan in the lead roles. His son Johnny alias Imran chakravarthy debuted as actor in Renigunta which he produced, along with Johnny's subsequent film, 18 Vayasu and also has a daughter, Shakeel Nila chakravarthy.

Filmography

Producer

Actor
 Vilangu (2022) (Web Series)

References

External links
 
 NIC Arts at IMDb

Living people
Tamil film producers
Year of birth missing (living people)